The Bang Khun Phrom Palace is a former royal residence in Bangkok, Thailand. It served as the residence of Prince Paribatra Sukhumbandhu until his forced exile following the Siamese revolution of 1932.

The palace is located on the east bank of the Chao Phraya River, on Samsen Road, Phra Nakhon District. It consists of two main buildings, the road-facing Tamnak Yai (main residence) and the river-facing Tamnak Somdet (residence of Queen Sukhumala Marasri, who was mother of the Prince). The main residence, designed by Mario Tamagno in neo-Baroque/Rococo style, was built in 1901–1902, while the Queen's residence was built around 1913 to designs by Karl Döhring in the Jugendstil or German Art Nouveau style.

Following the revolution, the palace served as the site of several government offices until it became the headquarters of the Bank of Thailand in 1945. It now serves as a museum, and housed the Bank of Thailand Museum until 2017, when its main exhibition was moved to the Bank of Thailand Learning Center housed in the opposite former bank note printing press building. The palace building is a registered ancient monument, and received the ASA Architectural Conservation Award in 1993.

In the Siamese revolution of 1932, after Khana Ratsadon (people's party) can seize the Royal Plaza and cut off all telecommunications systems includes after announcing the first manifesto. Some of the forces have invaded here in order to control Prince  Paribatra Sukhumbandhu, who served as the regent.  At that time he and his wife, along with a number of royal pages were about to flee by boat at pier behind the palace.

References

Former royal residences in Bangkok
Registered ancient monuments in Bangkok
Phra Nakhon district
Art Nouveau architecture in Thailand
Baroque Revival architecture in Thailand
Buildings and structures on the Chao Phraya River